is a Japanese sailor. He competed at the 1996 Summer Olympics and the 2000 Summer Olympics.

References

External links
 

1963 births
Living people
Japanese male sailors (sport)
Olympic sailors of Japan
Sailors at the 1996 Summer Olympics – Laser
Sailors at the 2000 Summer Olympics – 49er
Place of birth missing (living people)
Sailors at the 1990 Asian Games
Medalists at the 1990 Asian Games
Asian Games bronze medalists for Japan
Asian Games medalists in sailing